Clive Wood (born 8 May 1954) is an English actor, known for his television roles in Press Gang (1989–93), The Bill (1990), London's Burning (1996–99), and as King Henry I in The Pillars of the Earth (2010). His stage roles include playing Stephano in The Tempest at Shakespeare's Globe (2011) and Antony in Antony and Cleopatra at the Haymarket (2014). His film appearances include The Innocent (1985), Buster (1988) and Suffragette (2015).

Career
Games:
Clive Wood Voices "The Pirate Lord" from the popular Video game "Sea of Thieves" from Rare.

Film and television
Born in Croydon, Surrey, Wood's first starring TV role was as Vic Brown, opposite Joanne Whalley and Susan Penhaligon, in the 1982 ITV drama series based on the novel A Kind of Loving. He has played Matt Kerr in Press Gang, DCI Gordon Wray in The Bill and Jack Morgan in London's Burning. He also played Captain Smollett in the 1990 TV film, Treasure Island (having previously played Dick in the 1977 BBC version). He has also appeared in a cameo as an Auton masquerading as a Roman commander in the Doctor Who episode The Pandorica Opens.

Wood played the role of Blair in Mr. Palfrey of Westminster (1984–85), and Stephen Richford in an episode of the television series A Touch of Frost entitled "Dancing in the Dark" (2004). In 2011 he played Jack Gillespie in Series 2 of Land Girls.  He was also in the television series Midsomer Murders, playing the role of Geoffrey Larkin in the episode "Secrets and Spies" (2009), and again in 2014, playing Johnny Linklater in the episode "Wild Harvest".

Theatre
In 2006 Wood reprised his roles from the 2001 RSC productions of Henry VI Parts I, II and III, which included that of the Duke of York whose death led to the Wars of the Roses. The ensemble went on to perform Shakespeare's two histories cycles, culminating in early 2008 with The Glorious Moment — a chance to see all eight plays in succession.

He played Squadron Leader Swanson in the 2011 revival of Terence Rattigan's Second World War drama Flare Path at the Theatre Royal, Haymarket directed by Trevor Nunn. He next joined the cast of Nunn's production of The Tempest as Stephano, playing at the Haymarket from August to October 2011.

In 2014 Clive played Antony in Antony and Cleopatra at Shakespeare's Globe. The play, directed by Jonathan Munby, with Eve Best as Cleopatra, Jolyon Coy as Octavius Caesar and Phil Daniels as Enobarbus was running from 17 May until 24 August 2014.

Filmography

References

External links
 

English male television actors
English male film actors
English male stage actors
Living people
1954 births